Johann Karl Emil Eduard Haber (1 October 1866 – 14 January 1947) was a German mining engineer, civil servant and diplomat, who served as the last Governor of German New Guinea.

Early life
Haber was born on 1 October 1866 in Mechernich, in the Rhine Province of Prussia. After 1884 in Brilon, Eduard Haber studying the Bergfach from 1885 to 1888 at the universities of Freiburg, Aachen and Bonn.

After finishing his studies in 1888, Haber was first the Bergreferendar, and from 1893 an assessor at the Oberbergamt Bonn. After a tour in 1889, which led him to Mexico and Peru, he became a teacher at the Bergakademie Berlin (Prussian Mining Academy). In 1896 he traveled on behalf of the Deutsche Bank to Australia and the United States. After his return, Haber was S hut (Silesia), appointed to the Deputy Inspector of the hut in 1900 at the lodge Office and in the same year in the Imperial colonial service of Foreign Ministry .

In 1901 his use as mountain official at the governorate was Dar es Salaam in German East Africa. In 1903, Haber, who previously had been appointed in the year to the Governing Council, was appointed as the first speakers of the province and promoted to the Privy Council in 1906. In 1907, Haber became lecturer Council in the Imperial Colonial Office to Berlin and received his appointment to the secret Oberregierungsrat in 1910.

In 1913, Haber was appointed as the Deputy-Governor of German New Guinea (DNG). Due to being granted leave for illness, Governor Albert Hahl departed for Germany on 22 January 1914 and Haber was appointed provisional Governor in Rabaul.

World War I
Haber learned of the outbreak of World War I while in Morobe. Returning to Rabaul on 14 August, he organized an armed resistance force of about 50 settlers and 250 locals, but was defeated by an overwhelming Australian force at the Siege of Toma. After surrendering on 17 September, Haber made an oath of neutrality. Together with 11 other German prisoners of war, he was brought to Sydney on the captured steamer SMS Komet and interned on 29 October in a camp at Holsworthy, New South Wales. On 15 January 1915, together with his secretary, he was deported to San Francisco aboard the SS Sonoma, from where he finally was able to return to Germany.

In Berlin, he continued as the Acting-Governor of German New Guinea and was officially appointed Governor on 14 December 1917, as Hahl was declared unfit by Wilhelm Solf, the Imperial Colonial Secretary. This appointment resulting in Haber becoming the last Governor of German New Guinea. Both Emperor Wilhelm II and Erich Ludendorff believed that the continuation of a Governorship during the war was a hasty and badly conceived decision, as the Pacific colony would play no further role for Germany.

Life after the war
At peace talks to the C Mandates of the League of Nations, Haber was appointed as the second member of the German delegation in May 1919. He later resigned due to the hopelessness of his work in negotiations and took over the Coal Management Institute in Mecklenburg.

In 1920, Haber was appointed President of the Imperial Pay Board. After leaving the Imperial service in 1923, he assumed a teaching position at the Bergakademie Clausthal and received an Honorary Professorship in 1924, remaining there until 1927. Between 1928 and 1945, Haber taught at the University of Tübingen as mandated lecturer for international colonial science and the resource sector. Although never receiving a doctorate, he was often titled "Dr". His request to be granted an honorary doctorate was rejected and he had to be satisfied with a conferred honorary citizenship in 1936.

He died on 14 January 1947 at Tübingen. In 1936 the city honoured him with the naming of a street.

References

1866 births
1947 deaths
People from Euskirchen (district)
People from the Rhine Province
Colonial people of German East Africa
Colonial people of German New Guinea
History of Papua New Guinea
German prisoners of war in World War I
Academic staff of the University of Tübingen
Academic staff of the Technical University of Berlin